The second season of the medical drama series The Night Shift aired between February 23, 2015 and May 18, 2015, on NBC in the United States. It was produced by Sachs/Judah Productions, and Sony Pictures Television with series creators Gabe Sachs and Jeff Judah serving as executive producers.

The series follows the overnight shift at San Antonio Medical Center, where three of the surgeons have a connection to the U.S. military. Dr. TC Callahan (Eoin Macken) is an ex-Army medic who initially exhibits PTSD-type symptoms, having watched his brother die right in front of him on the battlefield. He tends to go his own way at the hospital, frequently breaking rules and butting heads with his ex-girlfriend and newly appointed head of the night shift, Dr. Jordan Alexander (Jill Flint), and the hospital's former administrator, Michael Ragosa (Freddy Rodriguez).

The Night Shift was renewed for a 14-episode second season on July 1, 2014. On May 8, 2015, it was renewed for a third season, which is expected to air as a midseason replacement in the 2015-16 Television season.

The first episode of the season premiered to 5.52 million viewers, and a  1.5/4 adults 18-49 rating. The season finale dropped to 5.20 million viewers with a 1.2/4 18-49 rating.

Production
The Night Shift was renewed for a second season on July 1, 2014, and when Gabe Sachs received the call, he described it as "the greatest moment ever, amazing." On December 12, 2014, it was revealed that the show would be returning on February 23, 2015 in the post-Voice timeslot. At a TCA Press Panel, series creators Jeff Judah and Gabe Sachs both said that the new timeslot with such a powerful lead-in was "a really big deal for us."

The producers stated that they would not take on the Ebola outbreak as a subject in the second season because they didn't "know where that's going to go;" instead they are going to focus on odd and crazy stories in the headlines. Filming for the second season began on November 10, 2014 in Albuquerque, New Mexico. "Fog of War" was not written as the sixth episode of the season. It was aired out of order and as a result, there are timeline inconsistencies. It was written to air earlier in the season.

Casting
The role of Landry de la Cruz (portrayed by Daniella Alonso), the lone psychiatrist on the night shift, was scrapped for season 2 amid "changes in the creative direction" of the show. At A TCA Press Panel, executive producer Jeff Judah stated that "we're opening up and getting more surgery and more of the paramedic world." Series creator, and executive producer Gabe Sachs added that "creatively we just decided to focus more on the ER stuff." On October 30, 2014, it was revealed that Adam Rodríguez would be joining the cast as a recurring character, Dr. Joey Chavez, a newly hired trauma surgeon. He is an Air Force Veteran who fought in Iraq, and brings an Eastern Medicine perspective to his cases. On November 7, 2014, Merle Dandridge was cast for a recurring role of Gwen Gaskin, "a lead paramedic working at San Antonio Memorial Hospital and the best friend of Jill Flint's Dr. Jordan Alexander."

Cast

Main cast
 Eoin Macken as Dr. TC Callahan
 Jill Flint as Dr. Jordan Alexander
 Ken Leung as Dr. Topher Zia
 Brendan Fehr as Dr. Drew Alister
 Robert Bailey Jr. as Dr. Paul Cummings
 Jeananne Goossen as Dr. Krista Bell-Hart
 J.R. Lemon as ER Nurse Kenny Fournette
 Freddy Rodriguez as Dr. Michael Ragosa

Recurring cast
 Esodie Geiger as Nurse Molly Ramos 
 Alma Sisnero as Nurse Diaz 
 Catharine Pilafas as Nurse Bardocz 
 Luke MacFarlane as Rick Lincoln 
 Adam Rodríguez as Dr. Joey Chavez
 Scott Wolf as Dr. Scott Clemmens
 Merle Dandridge as Gwen Gaskin

Episodes

Broadcast
The Night Shift airs on Global TV in Canada, and on Universal Channel in Australia.

References

2015 American television seasons